The 1947 Tour de France was the 34th edition of Tour de France, one of cycling's Grand Tours. The Tour began in Paris with a flat stage on 25 June, and Stage 12 occurred on 8 July with a flat stage from Marseille. The race finished in Paris on 20 July.

Stage 12
8 July 1947 — Marseille to Montpellier,

Stage 13
10 July 1947 — Montpellier to Carcassonne,

Stage 14
11 July 1947 — Carcassonne to Luchon,

Stage 15
13 July 1947 — Luchon to Pau,

Stage 16
14 July 1947 — Pau to Bordeaux,

Stage 17
15 July 1947 — Bordeaux to Les Sables d'Olonne,

Stage 18
16 July 1947 — Les Sables d'Olonne to Vannes,

Stage 19
17 July 1947 — Vannes to St. Brieuc,  (ITT)

Stage 20
18 July 1947 — St. Brieuc to Caen,

Stage 21
20 July 1947 — Caen to Paris,

References

1947 Tour de France
Tour de France stages